Kaleb Johnson (born February 22, 1993) is a former American football guard. He played college football at Rutgers.

College career
Johnson started 50 career games at Rutgers, starting all 13 games at left guard as a senior. He was named honorable mention All-Big Ten at guard by the media and the league's head coaches.

Professional career

Baltimore Ravens
Johnson signed with the Baltimore Ravens as an undrafted free agent on May 7, 2015. He was waived on September 5, 2015 and was signed to the practice squad the next day. He was promoted to the active roster on November 30, 2015, but was waived on December 12, 2015.

Cleveland Browns
Johnson was claimed off waivers by the Cleveland Browns on December 14, 2015. He was waived on September 3, 2016, and was signed to the practice squad the next day, but was released the following day.

Arizona Cardinals
Johnson was signed to the Arizona Cardinals' practice squad on September 29, 2016. He signed a reserve/future contract with the Cardinals on January 3, 2017.

On September 2, 2017, Johnson was waived by the Cardinals.

Kansas City Chiefs
On December 13, 2017, Johnson was signed to the Kansas City Chiefs' practice squad. He signed a reserve/future contract with the Chiefs on January 10, 2018. He was waived on June 14, 2018.

Chicago Bears
On August 4, 2018, Johnson signed with the Chicago Bears. He was waived on August 11, 2018.

Minnesota Vikings
On August 13, 2018, Johnson signed with the Minnesota Vikings. He was waived on August 31, 2018.

Philadelphia Eagles
On December 14, 2018, Johnson was signed to the Philadelphia Eagles practice squad. He signed a reserve/future contract with the Eagles on January 14, 2019. On May 1, 2019, Johnson was waived by the Eagles.

Baltimore Brigade
On May 7, 2019, Johnson was assigned to Baltimore Brigade.

Ottawa Redblacks
Johnson signed with the Ottawa Redblacks on May 19, 2019, and was moved to their retired list three days later.

References

1993 births
Living people
Arizona Cardinals players
Baltimore Ravens players
Chicago Bears players
Cleveland Browns players
Kansas City Chiefs players
Minnesota Vikings players
Philadelphia Eagles players
Players of American football from Jacksonville, Florida
Rutgers Scarlet Knights football players
Baltimore Brigade players
Ottawa Redblacks players